Charles Thomas Chapman (11 January 1905 – 17 April 1978) was an Australian rules footballer who played with Fitzroy in the Victorian Football League (VFL).

Family
His son, James Chapman, played for Fitzroy in the 1950s.

Football
Chapman, a ruckman and centre half-forward, first appeared for Fitzroy in the 1924 finals. He played in two semi finals and kicked two goals in each. This made him the first ever Fitzroy player to make his league debut in a finals series.

He was a regular fixture in the Fitzroy team from 1925 and also represented Victoria at interstate football on 10 occasions, including matches in the 1930 Adelaide Carnival.

In 1929 he captained Fitzroy for the season but they would finish second last on the ladder and vacated the position when Colin Niven became playing coach.

Chapman was Fitzroy's leading goal-kicker in the 1930 VFL season with 46 goals from 18 games. This included seven goal hauls against both Melbourne and Hawthorn. It was the only season in full-forward Jack Moriarty's 10 years at Fitzroy that he wouldn't top the goal-kicking.

Notes

References

1905 births
1978 deaths
People educated at Scotch College, Melbourne
Australian rules footballers from Melbourne
Australian Rules footballers: place kick exponents
Fitzroy Football Club players
People from Clifton Hill, Victoria